Holding Slovenske elektrarne (HSE) is a state-owned power generation company in Slovenia. It is the largest company in Slovenia and was established by a government decision on 26 July 2001. The company consists of hydroelectric plants based on the Drava, Sava, and Soča rivers and coal-fired power plants in Brestanica, Šoštanj, and Velenje.

HSE has the following subsidiaries:
 Dravske elektrarne Maribor (Drava Hydroelectric Plants in Maribor)
 Savske elektrarne Ljubljana (Sava Hydroelectric Plants in Ljubljana)
 Soške elektrarne Nova Gorica (Soča Hydroelectric Plants in Nova Gorica)
 TE Brestanica (Brestanica Coal-Fired Power Plant)
 TE Šoštanj (Šoštanj Coal-Fired Power Plant)
 Premogovnik Velenje (Velenje Coal-Mining Company)
 HSE Italia
 HSE Balkan Energy
 HSE Hungary

On 28 August 2007 HSE acquired the Ruse Iztok Power Plant in Bulgaria for €81 million.

See also

Elektro-Slovenija

References

External links
 

Electric power companies of Slovenia
Government-owned energy companies